Eric Matthias (born February 13, 1984) is an athlete from British Virgin Islands. He participated in men's discus throw at 2008 Summer Olympics. He was ranked 36 (53.11 m.).

Achievements

References
 

Living people
1984 births
Athletes (track and field) at the 2008 Summer Olympics
British Virgin Islands discus throwers
Olympic athletes of the British Virgin Islands
Male discus throwers
British Virgin Islands male athletes